Empire Township may refer to the following places in the United States:

 Empire Township, McLean County, Illinois
 Empire Township, Ellsworth County, Kansas
 Empire Township, McPherson County, Kansas
 Empire Township, Dakota County, Minnesota
 Empire Township, Leelanau County, Michigan
 Empire Township, Andrew County, Missouri

Township name disambiguation pages